South Korea, as Republic of Korea, competed at the 1956 Winter Olympics in Cortina d'Ampezzo, Italy.  The nation returned to the Winter Games after missing the 1952 Winter Olympics due to Korean War.

Speed skating

References
Official Olympic Reports

Korea, South
1956
1956 in South Korean sport